Vairamuthu Ramasamy (born 13 July 1953) is an Indian lyricist, poet, and novelist working in the Tamil film industry. He is a prominent figure in the Tamil literary world. A master's graduate from the Pachaiyappa's College in Chennai, he first worked as a translator, while also being a published poet. He entered the Tamil film industry in the year 1980, with the film Nizhalgal, an Ilaiyaraaja musical, directed by Bharathiraja. During the course of his 40-year film career, he has written over 7,500 songs and poems which have won him seven National Awards, the most for any Indian lyricist. He has also been honored with a Padma Shri, a Padma Bhushan and a Sahitya Akademi Award, for his abundant literary output.

Early life 
Vairamuthu was born on July 13, 1953, to Ramasamy and his wife Angammal, who were agriculturalists based in the village of Mettoor, in the district of Theni, Tamil Nadu. In 1957, his family was forced to move to Vadugapatti, another village in the Theni district, due to the construction of Vaigai Dam across the river Vaigai, which led to evacuation of 14 villages (including Mettur). In his new surroundings, he also took up agriculture in addition to his academics.

From a very young age, Vairamuthu was drawn towards the language and literature of Tamil. The Dravidian movement in Tamil Nadu during the 1960s, made a significant impression on his youth and he was inspired by several prominent individuals associated with language, such as Periyar E. V. Ramasamy, 'Perarignar' Annadurai, Kalaignar Mu. Karunanidhi, Subramania Bharathi, Bharathidasan and Kannadasan. He began writing poems from the age of ten and by his early teens, he was noted as a prominent orator and poet in his school. At the age of fourteen, he wrote a group of venba poems, having been inspired by Thiruvalluvar’s Tirukkuṛaḷ.

Education and early career 
During the stint of his under-graduation at Pachaiyappa’s College in Chennai, he was acclaimed as a speaker and poet. In his sophomore year, he published his first anthology of poems, titled Vaigarai Megangal ('Clouds at Dawn'), at the age of nineteen. The book was prescribed as part of the curriculum in the Women's Christian College, giving Vairamuthu the distinction of being a writer whose work was part of a syllabus, while he was still a student. He completed a 2 year Master's program in Arts in the field of Tamil literature at the Madras University.

After his education, he began his professional career at the Tamil Nadu Official Language Commission in the mid-1970s, as a translator of law books and documents from English to Tamil, working under Justice Maharajan. In addition to this, he continued writing poetry, bringing out a second anthology of poems in 1979, titled Thiruthi Ezhuthiya Theerpugal ('Revised and rewritten').

Family and personal life 
He is married to Ponmani, a Tamil scholar and former professor at the Meenakshi College for Women. They have two sons, Madhan Karky and Kabilan, who both work as lyricists and dialogue writers for Tamil films.

Film career

Debut and early years 
Upon reading his poems, he was signed on as a lyricist by the director Bharathiraja for the film Nizhalgal in the year 1980. The first song he wrote in his career, was "Pon Maalai Pozhuthu", which was composed by "Isaignani" Ilaiyaraaja and sung by S.P. Balasubrahmanyam. The first song of his that was released, was "Batrakali Uttamaseeli" (also composed by Ilaiyaraaja) from the film Kaali, which was released four months before Nizhalgal. Vairamuthu quit his career as a translator to work full-time in the film industry.

After Nizhalgal, Vairamuthu and Ilaiyaraaja kicked off a successful collaboration which would last a little more than half a decade. Their joint association with director Bharathiraja, led to some of the most critically acclaimed soundtracks such as Alaigal Oivathillai (which won Vairamuthu his first Tamil Nadu State Film Award for Best Lyricist), Kaadhal Oviyam, Mann Vasanai, Pudhumai Penn, Oru Kaidhiyin Diary, Muthal Mariyathai (which won Vairamuthu his first National Award for Best Lyricist) and Kadalora Kavithaigal. During the period he was working with Ilaiyaraaja, Vairamuthu collaborated with director Mani Ratnam for the first time in Idhaya Kovil in 1985, penning the song "Naan Padum Mouna Ragam" (which inspired the title of Ratnam's breakthrough Mouna Ragam, which was released in the following year).

Besides their work with Bharathiraja, the combination of the lyricist and the composer tasted success with more soundtracks such as Raja Paarvai, Ninaivellam Nithya, Nallavanukku Nallavan, Salangai Oli and Sindhu Bhairavi (the latter two yielding Ilaiyaraaja his first two National Awards for Music Direction).

Vairamuthu also worked as a lyricist with composer M.S. Viswanathan on the film Thanneer Thanneer and V. S. Narasimhan on the films Achamillai Achamillai and Kalyana Agathigal. All three films were directed by K. Balachander.

In 1986, he debuted as screenwriter for the film Natpu, directed by Ameerjan. He later had three further collaborations as a writer with the director in Thulasi (1987), Vanna Kanavugal (1987) and Vanakkam Vathiyare (1991). He also penned the dialogues for Andru Peytha Mazhaiyil (1989), which was directed by the National award-winning cinematographer Ashok Kumar.

Split with Ilaiyaraaja 
After K. Balachander's Punnagai Mannan (1986), Vairamuthu and Ilaiyaraaja parted ways. After their split, Vairamuthu's career stalled for the next five years, when he worked largely on lyrics for other language films that were dubbed in Tamil. His association with director Bharathiraja remained intact, as the duo worked together in the late 1980s on films such as Vedham Pudhithu (composed by Devendran) and Kodi Parakuthu (composed by Hamsalekha). He also worked with Bollywood composers such as R. D. Burman in the film Ulagam Pirandhadhu Enakkaga and the duo Laxmikant–Pyarelal on Uyire Unakkaga.

During this time, he also collaborated with composer Chandrabose on the films Shankar Guru, Makkal En Pakkam, Manithan, Katha Nayagan, Thaimel Aanai, Paatti Sollai Thattathe, Vasanthi, Raja Chinna Roja and Sugamana Sumaigal. They last worked together on Aadhikkam, which was released in 2005.

Resurgence 
In 1991, K. Balachander signed Vairamuthu as a lyricist for three of his productions, which were set for release in the following year: Vaaname Ellai, Annamalai and Roja. The first film (directed by Balachander himself) was composed by M.M. Keeravani (credited as 'Maragadhamani' in Tamil), the second (directed by Suresh Krissna) had music scored by Deva, and the third (directed by Mani Ratnam) by a debuting composer named A.R. Rahman.

Roja was director Mani Ratnam's first film after his split with composer Ilaiyaraaja, and its music is widely regarded as changing the face of not just Tamil, but Indian music. The song "Chinna Chinna Aasai", the first film song which Rahman had composed, won Vairamuthu his second National award for the Best Lyricist. The album secured A.R. Rahman the National Award for the Best Music Direction, a first for a debutant.

Following Roja, the combination of A.R. Rahman and Vairamuthu became heavily sought after, collaborating on several films throughout the next 25 years. Their continued association with director Mani Ratnam (which spans the length of Rahman's career), led to critical and commercial success on films such as Thiruda Thiruda (1993), Bombay (1995), Alaipayuthey (2000), Kannathil Muthamittal (2002), Aayutha Ezhuthu (2004), Raavanan (2010), Kadal (2013), O Kadhal Kanmani (2015). Kaatru Veliyidai (2017) and Chekka Chivantha Vaanam (2018). Four out of Vairamuthu's seven National awards for the Best Lyricist came out of his association with Rahman (on films such as Roja, Karuththamma, Pavithra; he was recognized by the National awards committee for his efforts on both these films in 1995, Sangamam and Kannathil Muthamittal) and four out of Rahman's six National Awards came from his association with Vairamuthu (on the films Roja, Minsara Kanavu, Kannathil Muthamittal and Kaatru Veliyidai). Singers P. Unnikrishnan, S.P. Balasubrahmanyam, Shankar Mahadevan, Swarnalatha, K.S. Chitra and Shashaa Tirupati have all won National awards for their work in collaboration with this duo.

In addition to their association with Mani Ratnam, the team of Rahman and Vairamuthu are also noted for their collaboration with director Shankar (on Gentleman, Kadhalan, Indian, Jeans, Mudhalvan, Sivaji, and Enthiran), Bharathiraja (on Kizhakku Cheemayile, Karuththamma, Anthimanthaarai and Taj Mahal), K. S. Ravikumar (on Muthu, Padayappa and Varalaru) and Rajiv Menon (on Minsara Kanavu and Kandukonden Kandukonden). Some of their other popular films include Pudhiya Mugam, Duet, May Madham, Rhythm, Kochadaiiyaan, and 24.

Vairamuthu is also known for his work in the 90s and early 2000s with composer Deva, on popular soundtracks such as Annamalai, Baasha, Aasai, Once More, Arunachalam, Nerukku Ner, Vaali, Kushi, and Panchathanthiram. He has also worked extensively with Bharadwaj (on popular soundtracks such as Kaadhal Mannan, Pooveli,
Amarkalam, Rojavanam, Parthen Rasithen, Rojakootam, Gemini, Jay Jay, Attagasam, Vasool Raja MBBS, Idhaya Thirudan, Vattaram, Asal and Aayirathil Iruvar), Harris Jayaraj, D. Imman, Vidyasagar, Shankar–Ehsaan–Loy (on both their Tamil projects, Aalavandhan and Vishwaroopam), N. R. Raghunanthan (which secured him his sixth National Award for the film Thenmerku Paruvakaatru) and Yuvan Shankar Raja (the son of Ilaiyaraaja; their association yielded him his seventh National Award for the film Dharma Durai). During his nearly 40-year career, he has worked with over 150 music directors.

In addition to lyrics, Vairamuthu has also penned poems which feature as part of the dialogue, on films such as Duet, Iruvar (for the character played by Prakash Raj), and Aalavandhan (for the character of Nandu; played by Kamal Haasan). He has also penned lyrics for the theme songs of many Tamil television shows and jingles for advertisements, the most notable among them being the theme for the Tamil soap opera Chithi.

Contribution to literature 
Vairamuthu has written 37 books which include collections of poetry as well as novels in the Tamil language. Several of them have been translated into English, Hindi, Malayalam, Telugu, Kannada, Russian and Norwegian. He introduced the work of foreign poets to Tamil readers in his Ella Nadhiyilum En Odam. Over 2.6 million copies of his works have been sold. In 1991, four of his books were released on the same day in a grand manner in Madurai by the ex-Chief Minister Karunanidhi.

He has also been a speaker at many prominent Tamil conferences in the United States, United Kingdom, Russia, Australia, Japan, Canada, Hong Kong, China, Singapore, Malaysia, Thailand, United Arab Emirates, Kuwait, Oman, Maldives, Switzerland and Sri Lanka.

For his work in literature, he was also conferred the titles of Kavi Samrat ("King of Poetry") by former Indian Prime Minister Atal Bihari Vajpayee, Kaapiya Kavignar ("Epic Poet") by former Indian President A.P.J. Abdul Kalam and Kaviperarasu ("The Emperor of Poets") by former Tamil Nadu Chief Minister M. Karunanidhi.

Notable works 

Kallikkattu Ithikasam (The Saga of the Drylands)

Kallikkattu Ithikasam depicts the story of the people of a village who have turned refugees in independent India. In the 1950s, when Vaigai dam was constructed in Madurai District, 14 villages were vacated for creating the water catchment area. This novel narrates the tearful story of those refugees who lost their land under the water. The author is a child born to one such family and had lived through the misery of this migration in his childhood. The story portrays the tears, blood and pain of the villagers whose families were crushed as a result of modernization. The soul of the novel echoes the truth behind the values of agrarian India and the virtues of farmers which are eternal. This saga won Vairamuthu the Sahitya Akademi Award for the Best Literary Work in the year 2003, and has been translated into 22 languages. The novel sold over a lakh copies.

Karuvachchi Kaviyam (The Epic of Karuvachchi)

Karuvachchi Kaviyam revolves around a vulnerable Indian village woman who has been enslaved by the illiterate male chauvinistic community.

Poems of Vairamuthu

The core of Vairamuthu's poetry portrays his pleading to the human to appreciate nature, pointing to the incredible truth that fire is fire as long as it burns, Earth is Earth as long as it spins and Man is man as long as he struggles.

Moondram Ulagappor (Third World War)

The struggle of the Indian agrarian community due to globalization, liberalisation and global warming is depicted in this novel in the farmer's dialectical language. This novel is a prophecy on the suicides of farmers five years before it had happened. The author was heartbroken when the poverty-stricken farmers who were unable to feed their families due to failure of monsoon, severe drought conditions, debt and despair, committed suicide.

Other endeavors and philanthropic activities 
Vairamuthu has set up a foundation, the Vairamuthu Educational Trust, which provides funding to underprivileged families for education of their children. He served as President of the Indo-Soviet Cultural Association. From the proceeds of the sales of Moondram Ulaga Poor, a sum of Rs. 11 lakh was donated to the widows of farmers who committed suicide.

He is the founder of the Vetri Tamizhar Peravai, which aims at uplifting society. He also donated a hospital building to the people of his native village of Karattuppatti, and started a library in the name of the esteemed poet Kannadasan, in his village of Vadugapatti. He has also made contributions to victims of war as well to those of natural calamities.

Controversies 
Vairamuthu delivered a speech on the seventh century mystic poet, Andal in January 2018 during a discussion on Andal at the Srivilliputhur Andal Temple where quoted the research of an American scholar who said that Andal belonged to the Devadasi community, a religious system practiced in parts of South India in which a where young girls used to be married to the deity of the temple before they attain puberty and will spend the rest of their lives in the service of the temple. In many cases, they were sexually exploited and pushed into prostitution. He said that Andal had lived and died at the Srirangam temple in Tiruchirappalli according to the American scholar. BJP leader H Raja criticized the speech. Vairamuthu later issued an apology claiming that his speech was intentionally twisted by vested interests and that he has expressed regret for a mistake he did not commit and also said that he only intends to glorify Mother Andal and he has been working on many great Tamil poets. Some Tamil writers claimed that there is nothing controversial about his speech because he only referred the article. Minor girls and boys in Nithyananda's Ashram  published videos using derogatory language, many sexual in nature, as they questioned his speech. This has generated anger amongst the general public, which found the use of children by Nithyananda in such a manner objectionable. A case was also filed against Vairamuthu.

Sexual harassment allegations 
As a part of the #MeToo movement, Vairamuthu was accused of sexual harassment in 2018 by singer Chinmayi Sripada and Bhuvana Seshan. Journalist Sandhya Menon also tweeted allegations against Vairamuthu messaged to her by a woman. Hayma Malini claimed that one of the presenters of a TV channel, where she worked was harassed by Vairamuthu. Vairamuthu denied all allegations and said they are "filled with ulterior motives". He also said that he is ready to face any legal action and said let the court decide.

Filmography

As writer 
Natpu (1986)
Odangal (1986)
Thulasi (1987)
Vanna Kanavugal (1987)
Andru Peytha Mazhaiyil (1989)
Vanakkam Vathiyare (1991)
Captain (1994)

Awards and recognition

Film career 

National Film Award for Best Lyrics
1985: All songs from Muthal Mariyathai
1992: "Chinna Chinna Aasai" from Roja
1994: "Poralae Ponnuthayi" from Karuththamma; "Uyirum Neeye" from Pavithra
1999: "Mudhal Murai Killipparthaein" from Sangamam
2002: "Oru Theivam Thantha Poovey" from Kannathil Muthamittal
2010: "Kallikkaattil Perandha Thaayae" from Thenmerku Paruvakaatru
2016: "Endha Pakkam" from Dharma Durai

Filmfare Award for Best Lyricist – Tamil
2005 "Oh Sukumari" from Anniyan – Won
2008: "Vaa Vaa" from Abhiyum Naanum – Nominated
2009: "Nenje Nenje" from Ayan – Nominated
2010: "Kadhal Anukkal" from Enthiran; "Usure Poguthey" from Raavanan – Nominated
2011: "Sara Sara" from Vaagai Sooda Vaa – Won
2012: "Para Para" from Neerparavai – Nominated
2013: "Chithirai Nila" from Kadal; "Sengaade" from Paradesi – Nominated
2014: "Ovvondrai Thirudigarai" from Jeeva – Nominated
2016: "Endha Pakkam" from Dharma Durai – Nominated
2017: "Vaan" from Kaatru Veliyidai – Won

Tamil Nadu State Film Award for Best Lyricist
1981-1982: "Vizhiyil Vizhundu" and "Kadhal Oviyam" from Alaigal Oivathillai
1995: "Poralae Ponnuthayi" from Karuththamma
1996: "Oruvan Oruvan" from Muthu; "Kannaalanae" from Bombay2000: "Mudhal Murai Killipparthaein" from Sangamam2005: "Oh Sukumari" and "Iyengaaru Veetu" from Anniyan
2007: All songs from PeriyarSIIMA Award for Best Lyricist – Tamil
2012: "Para Para" from Neerparavai – Nominated
2013: "Nenjukkulle" from Kadal – Nominated
2014: "Kandangi Kandangi" from Jilla – Nominated
2015: "Malargal Kettaen” from O Kadhal Kanmani – Won
2016: "Endha Pakkam" from Dharma Durai – Nominated
2017: "Vaan" from Kaatru Veliyidai – Nominated

Vijay Award for Best Lyricist
2007: "Kaatrin Mozhi" from Mozhi – Nominated
2008: "Vaa Vaa" from Abhiyum Naanum – Nominated
2009: "Nenje Nenje" from Ayan – Nominated
2010: "Arima Arima" from Enthiran; "Kallikkaatil Pirandha Thaaye" from Thenmerku Paruvakaatru – Won
2011: "Sara Sara" from Vaagai Sooda Vaa – Won
2013: "Nenjukkule" from Kadal – Nominated
2014: "Maatram Ondru" from Kochadaiiyaan – Nominated

 Civilian Honors 
2003: Padma Shri: For Distinguished Services in Literature and Education
2014: Padma Bhushan: For Distinguished Services in Literature and Education

 Literary awards and honors 
1999: S. P. Adithanar Literary Award for Best Tamil Novel for Thanneer Thesam2003: Sahitya Akademi Award for Best Literary Work for Kallikkaattu Ithihaasam2009: Sadhana Samman for contributions to Indian literature through poetry, novels and lyrics.
2013: Ilakkiya Sinthanai Award for Best Tamil Novel for Moondram Ulaga Por2013: Tansri K.R. Somasundaram Literature Foundation Award for Best Novel in Tamil Literature for Moondram Ulaga Por2018: Federation of Indian Chambers of Commerce & Industry's Book of the Year Award for Nākapani Vaṉkā Itihāsh (Hindi version of Kallikkaattu Ithihaasam)

 Other honors 

Tamil Nadu State Government Awards
1990: Kalaimamani Award
1990: Paavendhar Award

Honorary doctorates
2007: Tamil Nadu Open University
2008: Madurai Kamaraj University
2009: Bharathiar University
2021: O. N. V. Literary Award instituted by the ONV Cultural Academy (declined)

 Published works 

In Tamil:Vaikarai Megangal (1972)Thiruthi Ezhuthiiya Theerpugal (1979)Innoru Dhesiya Geetham (1982)Kavi Raajan Kadhai (1982)Idhu Varai Naan (1983) (his autobiography at the age of 28)En Pazhaiya Panai Oolaigal (1983)Vaanam Thottuvidum Thooramthan (1983)En Jannalin Vazhiye (1984)Mounathin Sapthangal (1984)Kalvettugal (1984)Kodi Marathin Vergal (1984)Kelvigalaal Oru Velvi (1984)Ratha Dhaanam (1985)Sirpiye Unnai Sethukukiren (1985)Netru Potta Kolam (1985)Meendum En Thottilukku (1986)Ella Nadhiyilum En Odam (1989)Vadugapatti Mudhal Volga Varai (1989)Indha Pookkal Virpanaikkalla (1991)Kaavi Nirathil oru Kaadhal (1991)Indha Kulathil Kal Erinthavargal (1991)Oru Porkkalamum Irandu Pookkalum (1991)Sigarangalai Nokki (1992)Idhanal Sakalamaanavargalukkum (1992)Villodu Vaa Nilave (1994)Thanneer Thesam (1996)Thamizhukku Niram Undu (1997)Peyyena Peyyum Mazhai (1999)*Vairamuthu Kavithaikal (2000)Kallikkaattu Ithihaasam (2001)Konjam Theneer Niraiya Vaanam (2005)Oru Giramathu Paravaiyum Sila kadalgalum (2005)Karuvaachi Kaaviyam (2006)Paarkadal (2008)Aayiram Paadalgal (2011)Moondram Ulaga Por (2013)Vairamuthu Sirukathaikal (2015)Tamizhatruppadai (2019)

Works Published in other Languages:

 Drops That Hop Without A Stop (Selected poems in English) – 2000 – Translated by Dr Vishnu Priya, Published by Hindi Hridaya, Chennai.
 A Drop in Search of the Ocean (Selected poems in English) – 2003 – Translated by Balan Menon, Published by Rupa & Co., New Delhi
 Vairamuthu Baavani (Selected poems in Hindi) – 2003 – Translated by Kamakshi subramaniam, Published by Hindi Hridaya, Chennai
 Bindhu Sindhu Ki Oor (Selected poems in Hindi) – 2004 – Translated by Dr Vishnu Priya, Published by Rajkamal Prakashan Pvt Ltd, New Delhi
 God Morgen Lyrikk (Selected Lyrics in Norwegian) – 2004 – Translated by Kowsihaa Gowrithasan, Published by Kowsihaa Gowrithasan, Norge
 Vairamuthu Ravara Muvathmuru Kavithegalu – 2009 (Selected poems in Kannada) – Translated by Prof. Malarvili, Published by Christ University Kannada, Bangalore.
 Siruthu Neram Manithanayi Irunthavan – 2017 (Selected short stories in Malayalam) – Translated by K.S.Venkitachalam, Published by Mathrubhumi Books, Kozhikode
 Nākapani Vaṉkā Itihāsh - Hindi (Kallikkattu Ithihaasam) – 2017 – (Sahitya Akademi Award Winning Novel & FICCI Book of the Year Award –2018) – Translated by H.Balasubramaniam, Published by Sahitya Akademi, New Delhi
 Kalligaadina Ithihaasa - Kannada (Kallikkattu Ithihaasam) – 2021 – (Sahitya Akademi Award Winning Novel & FICCI Book of the Year Award –2018) – Translated by  Malarvizhi.K, Published by Sahitya Akademi, New Delhi

References

External links 
 
 Vairamuthu's Thanner Thesam at MaduraiProject
 Library of Congress New Delhi Office

1953 births
Poets from Tamil Nadu
Living people
20th-century Indian poets
Indian lyricists
Tamil poets
Tamil writers
Tamil film poets
Recipients of the Sahitya Akademi Award in Tamil
Vairamuthu, R.
Filmfare Awards South winners
Tamil Nadu State Film Awards winners
Recipients of the Padma Bhushan in literature & education
Indian male poets
People from Theni district
20th-century Indian male writers
Best Lyrics National Film Award winners
Tamil-language lyricists